Turhan Selçuk (30 July 1922 – March 11, 2010) was a Turkish cartoonist.

Biography
Born in Muğla, Milas Selçuk was a prolific cartoonist. He is considered to be one of the few cartoonists in Turkey, who paved the way for the current Turkish cartoon scene.

Selçuk was the founder of the Turkish Cartoonists Association together with Semih Balcıoğlu and Ferit Öngören. İlhan Selçuk was his brother.  He died in Istanbul.

Awards and honors
 First Prize for caricature in the Journalism Achievement Award Competition organised by the Association of Journalism in Turkey (1955)
 Golden Palm at the International Festival of the Humor of Bordighera (Salone Internazionale dell'Umorismo di Bordighera) (1956)
 Aero Club Silver Cup International Festival of the Humor of Bordighera (Salone Internazionale dell'Umorismo di Bordighera) (1956)
 Silver Date at the International Festival of the Humor of Bordighera (Salone Internazionale dell'Umorismo di Bordighera) (1962)
 Ippocampo Award at the Ippocampo-Vasto Caricature Festival in Italy (1970)
 Artist of the People Award by the Union of Turkish Artists (1971)
 Silver Cup at the Verelli Caricature Biennial in Italy (1975)
 Achievement Award by the Association of Journalists in Turkey (1983)
 Achievement Award for Journalism by the Association of Journalists in Turkey (1987)
 Achievement Award for Journalism by the Association of Journalists in Turkey (1988)
 Achievement Award for Journalism by the Association of Journalists in Turkey (1989)
 Achievement Award for Journalism by the Association of Journalists in Turkey (1990)
 Best Caricaturists opinion poll to choose “The Best in the Last Twenty Years” among Boğaziçi University students as part of their twentieth anniversary celebrations (1992)
 Honorary doctorate ( Doctor Honoris Causa ) by Cumhuriyet University in Sivas, Turkey (1992)
 Honorary doctorate ( Doctor Honoris Causa ) by Anadolu University (1997)
 Presidential Grand Awards in Art and Culture, Turkey (1997)

Tribute
On July 30, 2020, Google celebrated his 98th birthday with a Google Doodle.

Bibliography
 Turhan Selçuk Karikatür Albümü (1954) (Turhan Selçuk Cartoon Album)
 140 Karikatür (1959) (140 Cartoons)
 Turhan 62 (1962)
 Hiyeroglif (1964) (Hieroglyph)
 Hal ve Gidis Sifir (1969) (A Zero for the Current Situation)
 Söz Çizginin (1979) (Line's Say)
 Insan Haklari (1995) (Human Rights)

Characters
 Abdülcanbaz
 Karanfil Hoca
 Tarzan
 Fettah
 Fayrabi
 Gözlüklü Sami Bey
 Sürmegöz Ihsan Bey

See also
İlhan Selçuk
Abdülcanbaz
Turkish Cartoonists Association
Saul Steinberg

References

External links
Turhan Selçuk Online Exhibition on the Eczacibasi Virtual Museum Website
Turhan Selçuk on Lambiek.net Comiclopedia

1922 births
2010 deaths
People from Milas
Turkish cartoonists
Akbaba (periodical) people